Yeshiva Gedolah may refer to:

Lubavitch Yeshiva Gedolah of Johannesburg
Yeshiva Centre, Melbourne
Yeshiva Gedola of Passaic
Yeshiva Gedolah
Yeshivah Centre, Sydney
Yeshivah Gedolah Zal, Melbourne, Australia